Atelomycterus is a genus of catsharks in the family Scyliorhinidae.

Species
There are currently six recognized species in this genus:
 Atelomycterus baliensis W. T. White, Last & Dharmadi, 2005 (Bali catshark)    
 Atelomycterus erdmanni Fahmi & W. T. White, 2015 (spotted-belly catshark) 
 Atelomycterus fasciatus Compagno & Stevens, 1993 (banded sand catshark)
 Atelomycterus macleayi Whitley, 1939 (Australian marbled catshark)
 Atelomycterus marmoratus Anonymous, referred to E. T. Bennett, 1830 (coral catshark)
 Atelomycterus marnkalha Jacobsen & M. B. Bennett, 2007 (eastern banded catshark)

References

 
Shark genera
Taxa named by Samuel Garman